Kilkenny was a parliamentary constituency represented in Dáil Éireann, the lower house of the Irish parliament or Oireachtas from 1937 to 1948. The constituency elected 3 deputies (Teachtaí Dála, commonly known as TDs) to the Dáil, on the system of proportional representation by means of the single transferable vote (PR-STV).

History 
The constituency was created for the 1937 general election, when the Electoral (Revision of Constituencies) Act 1935 split the old Carlow–Kilkenny constituency, with County Carlow being represented from 1937 through the new Carlow–Kildare constituency.

Under the Electoral (Amendment) Act 1947, the Kilkenny constituency was abolished, and Carlow–Kilkenny was restored for the 1948 general election.

Boundaries 
The 1937 Act defined the boundaries of the Kilkenny constituency as "the administrative County of Kilkenny".

TDs

Elections

1944 general election

1943 general election

1938 general election

1937 general election

See also 
Dáil constituencies
Politics of the Republic of Ireland
Historic Dáil constituencies
Elections in the Republic of Ireland

References

External links 
 Oireachtas Members Database

Dáil constituencies in the Republic of Ireland (historic)
Historic constituencies in County Kilkenny
1937 establishments in Ireland
1948 disestablishments in Ireland
Constituencies established in 1937
Constituencies disestablished in 1948